is a railway station in the city of Gamagōri, Aichi Prefecture, Japan, operated by Meitetsu.

Lines

Station layout
The station has a single island platform connected to the station building by a level crossing. The station is unattended.

Platforms

Adjacent stations

Station history
Nishiura Station was opened on July 24, 1936. The station has been unattended since June 1999.

Surrounding area
Nishiura onsen

See also
 List of Railway Stations in Japan

External links

Official web page

Railway stations in Japan opened in 1936
Railway stations in Aichi Prefecture
Stations of Nagoya Railroad
Gamagōri, Aichi